Henry Rhodes Hundley (August 10, 1867 – January 24, 1934) was an American educator who was the third head football coach at the University of Richmond. He held that position for the 1887 season, compiling a record of 1–1.

Hundley was later a faculty member at Denison University, where he served as the head football coach for one year, in 1900, compiling a record of 2–5–1.

Hundley was also dean of the Doane Academy from 1900 to 1927.

Head coaching record

References

External links
 

1867 births
1934 deaths
19th-century players of American football
Player-coaches
Denison Big Red football coaches
Richmond Spiders football coaches
Richmond Spiders football players
People from Louisa County, Virginia
Coaches of American football from Virginia
Players of American football from Virginia